The 4th Los Angeles Film Critics Association Awards, honoring the best in film for 1978, were announced on 16 December 1978.

Winners
Best Picture:
Coming Home
Best Director:
Michael Cimino – The Deer Hunter
Runners-up: Woody Allen – Interiors and Alan Parker – Midnight Express
Best Actor:
Jon Voight – Coming Home
Runner-up: Gary Busey – The Buddy Holly Story
Best Actress:
Jane Fonda – Coming Home, Comes a Horseman and California Suite
Runner-up: Ingrid Bergman – Autumn Sonata (Höstsonaten)
Best Supporting Actor:
Robert Morley – Who Is Killing the Great Chefs of Europe?
Best Supporting Actress (tie):
Maureen Stapleton – Interiors
Mona Washbourne – Stevie
Best Screenplay:
Paul Mazursky – An Unmarried Woman
Runners-up: Woody Allen – Interiors and Larry Gelbart and Sheldon Keller – Movie Movie
Best Cinematography:
Néstor Almendros – Days of Heaven
Runners-up: Sven Nykvist – Pretty Baby
Best Music Score:
Giorgio Moroder – Midnight Express
Best Foreign Film:
Madame Rosa (La vie devant soi) • France
New Generation Award:
Gary Busey
Career Achievement Award:
Orson Welles

References

External links
4th Annual Los Angeles Film Critics Association Awards

1978
Los Angeles Film Critics Association Awards
Los Angeles Film Critics Association Awards
Los Angeles Film Critics Association Awards
Los Angeles Film Critics Association Awards